Paiboon Vacharapan (born 23 November 1933) is a Thai sprinter. He competed in the men's 100 metres at the 1956 Summer Olympics.

References

External links
 

1933 births
Living people
Athletes (track and field) at the 1956 Summer Olympics
Athletes (track and field) at the 1960 Summer Olympics
Paiboon Vacharapan
Paiboon Vacharapan
Place of birth missing (living people)
Paiboon Vacharapan